Malawi competed at the 2022 Commonwealth Games at Birmingham, England from 28 July to 8 August 2022. Having made its Games debut in 1970, it was Malawi's fourteenth appearance to date.

Competitors
Malawi's team consisted of 22 athletes competing in five sports.

The following is the list of number of competitors participating at the Games per sport/discipline.

Athletics

Men
Track and road events

Women
Track and road events

Boxing

Judo

A squad of two judoka was entered as of 8 July 2022.

Netball

By virtue of its position in the World Netball Rankings (as of 28 July 2021), Malawi qualified for the tournament.

Partial fixtures were announced in November 2021, then updated with the remaining qualifiers in March 2022.

Summary

Roster

Joyce Mvula
Jane Chimaliro
Sindi Simtowe
Takondwa Lwazi
Thandi Galeta
Bridget Kumwenda
Shira Dimba
Martha Dambo
Caroline Mtukule
Towera Vinkhumbo
Loreen Ngwira
Jasinta Kumwenda

Group play

Seventh place match

Swimming

Men

Women

References

External links
Malawi Olympic Committee Official site

Nations at the 2022 Commonwealth Games
Malawi at the Commonwealth Games
2022 in Malawian sport